Andrea Palini (born 16 June 1989 in Gardone Val Trompia) is an Italian former professional cyclist, who rode professionally between 2012 and 2017 for the , ,  and  teams.

Major results

2007
 1st  Road race, National Junior Road Championships
2008
 10th Circuito del Porto
2009
 1st Trofeo Città di Brescia
 8th Trofeo Franco Balestra
2010
 1st Coppa Internazionale Colli Briantei
 10th Circuito del Porto
2011
 4th Gran Premio della Liberazione
 4th Circuito del Porto
2012
 1st Stage 1 Settimana Internazionale di Coppi e Bartali
 2nd Tre Valli Varesine
 2nd Gran Premio Industria e Commercio Artigianato Carnaghese
 4th Overall Course de Solidarność et des Champions Olympiques
 4th Memorial Marco Pantani
 5th Coppa Bernocchi
 9th Gran Premio Industria e Commercio di Prato
 10th Gran Premio Bruno Beghelli
2013
 1st Stage 2 La Tropicale Amissa Bongo
2014
 1st Stage 5 Tour of Hainan
2015
 Tour of Hainan
1st Stages 1 & 2
 1st Stage 4 La Tropicale Amissa Bongo
 2nd Overall Tour of Taihu Lake
 2nd Overall Sharjah International Cycling Tour
1st  Points classification
1st Stage 4
 2nd Overall Jelajah Malaysia
1st  Points classification
1st Stages 2 (TTT) & 4
 3rd Overall Tour d'Egypte
1st Stages 2 & 4
 3rd Vuelta a La Rioja
 5th UAE Cup
 7th Overall Tour of Al Zubarah
1st  Points classification
2016
 1st Stage 2 Tour de Langkawi
 1st Stage 1 (TTT) Sharjah International Cycling Tour
 2nd Overall La Tropicale Amissa Bongo
1st  Sprints classification
1st Stages 1 & 2
 2nd UAE Cup
2017
 1st Prologue Sibiu Cycling Tour
 5th Trofeo Matteotti

References

External links

1989 births
Living people
Italian male cyclists
Cyclists from the Province of Brescia